This is a list of streams and rivers in Ethiopia, arranged geographically by drainage basin.  There is an alphabetic list at the end of this article.

Flowing into the Mediterranean 
Nile (Egypt, Sudan)

Atbarah River 

Mareb River (or Gash River) (only reaches the Atbarah in times of flood)
Obel River
Tekezé River (or Takkaze or Setit)
Zarima River
Ataba River
Wari River
 Qortem Zer'a
 Tsaliet
 Agefet
 Ab'aro
 Azef River
 Amblo
 Korowya
 Ferrey River
 Kidane Mihret River
 May Meqa
 Graliwdo
 Giba River
 Tanqwa
 Tsech'i River
 May Qoqah
 Arwadito
 Adawro River
 May Selelo
 Zikuli River
 Gra Adiam River, also called Bitchoqo River
 Zeyi River
 Inda Sillasie River
 May Zegzeg
 May Harena
 May Sho'ate
 May Be'ati River
 Addi Keshofo River
 May Gabat 
 Inda Anbesa 
 Ruba Bich'i River
 Hurura
 Afedena River
 May Ayni
 Shimbula
 Ilala River
 Qarano River
 Agula'i River
 Genfel
 Sulluh
 Ch'eqofo River
Balagas River
Angereb River (or Greater Angereb River)
Shinfa River

Blue Nile (or Abay River) 

Rahad River
Dinder River
Beles River
Dabus River
Didessa River
Hanger River (or Angar River)
Wajja River
Gulla River
Guder River
Muger River
Jamma River
Wanchet River
Qechene River
Robe River
Dembi River
Walaqa River
Bashilo River
Checheho River
Lake Tana, into which flow
Gilgel Abay
Magech River
Lesser Angereb River
Reb River
Gumara River
Adar River (South Sudan)
Yabus River
Daga River (Deqe Sonka Shet)

Sobat River (South Sudan) 

Baro River
Jikawo River
Alero River (or Alwero River)
Birbir River
Dipa River
Kobara River 
Qarsa River
Gebba River
Sor River
Pibor River
Gilo River
Akobo River

Flowing into the Indian Ocean 

Jubba River
Shebelle River
Fafen River (only reaches the Shebelle in times of flood)
Jerer River
Erer River
Ramis River
Galetti River
Dungeta River
Gololcha River
Ganale Dorya River
Mena River
Weyib River or Gestro River
Welmel River
Dawa River

Flowing into endorheic basins

Afar Depression 

Awash River
Logiya River
Mille River
Ala River
Golima River
Borkana River
Ataye River
Hawadi River
Kabenna River
Germama River (or Kasam River)
Durkham River
Keleta River
Mojo River
Akaki River
Dechatu River

Lake Ziway 
Meki River
Katar River

Lake Turkana 

Kibish River
Omo River
Usno River
Mago River
Neri River
Mui River
Mantsa River
Zigina River
Denchya River
Gojeb River
Gibe River
Gilgel Gibe River
Maze River
Wabe River

Lake Abaya 
Bilate River
Gidabo River

Lake Chew Bahir 
Weito River
Sagan River

Alphabetic list

A to G 
Abay River - Adabay River - Akaki River - Akobo River - Ala River - Alero River - Angereb River - Ataba River - Ataye River - Atbarah River - Awash River - Awetu River - Ayesha River

Balagas River - Baro River - Bashilo River - Beles River - Bilate River - Birbir River - Blue Nile - Borkana River

Cheleleka River

Dabus River - Dawa River - Dechatu River - Dembi River - Denchya River - Didessa River - Dinder River - Doha River - Dukem River - Durkham River

Erer River

Fafen River

Galetti River - Ganale Dorya River - Gebba River - Gebele River - Germama River - Gestro River - Gidabo River - Gibe River - Gilgel Gibe River - Gilo River - Gojeb River - Golima River - Gololcha River - Greater Angereb River - Guder River - Gumara River

H to L

Hanger River - Hawadi River

Jamma River - Jerer River - Jikawo River - Jubba River

Kabenna River - Karsa River - Katar River - Keleta River - Kibish River - Kulfo River

Lagabora River - Lesser Abay - Lesser Angereb - Logiya River

M to S

Mago River - Magech River - Mareb River - Meki River - Mena River - Mille River - Modjo River - Mofar River - Muger River - Mui River

Neri River

Omo River

Pibor River

Qechene River

Rahad River - Reb River - Robe River

Sagan River - Shebelle River - Shinfa River - Sor River

T to Z

Tekezé River
Tella River 
Usno River - Ubbi Ubbi River

Wabe River - Walaqa River - Wajja River - Wanchet River - Wari River - Weito River - Weyib River - Welmel River

Yabus River

Zarima River

External links 
Map of major rivers of Ethiopia

Ethiopia
Rivers